Finger Lake may refer to:

 Finger lake, a narrow linear body of water occupying a glacially overdeepened valley 
 Finger Lakes, New York, U.S.
 Finger Lake (Alaska), U.S.
 Finger Lake, Finger-Tatuk Provincial Park, British Columbia, Canada